Baffert is a surname. Notable people with the surname include:

Bob Baffert (born 1953), American racehorse trainer
Émile Baffert (1924–2017), French road bicycle racer